Alwine Dollfuß (née Glienke; 12 February 1897 – 25 February 1973) was the wife of former Austrian chancellor Engelbert Dollfuß. At the time of his murder, she was in Italy with Benito Mussolini, who allowed her the use of his private plane to hurry back to Austria. She is  buried in Hietzinger Cemetery next to her husband, and two of her children; Hannerl and Eva. She was also satirized in Brecht's The Resistible Rise of Arturo Ui in 1941 as the character 'Betty Dullfeet'.

Dollfuß lived for a time after 1946 in Truro, Nova Scotia in Canada together with her two children, before leaving in 1957.

References

Walterskirchen, Gudula Engelbert Dollfuß, Arbeitermörder oder Heldenkanzler (Vienna: Molden Verlag, 2004)
Allinson, Mark Austrian Studies, Vol.14, No.1, 1 October 2006
Dollfuß, Eva Mein Vater - Hitlers erstes Opfer (Vienna: Amalthea Verlag, 1994)

External links
Dollfuss family

1897 births
1973 deaths
Immigration to Canada
Spouses of national leaders